Abraham Salm may refer to:

Adriaen van Salm, or Abraham Salm (c.1660 – 1720), painter from Delfshaven
Ab Salm, short for Abram Salm (1801–1876), painter from Amsterdam
Abraham Salm (architect) (1857–1915), architect from Amsterdam